Levellers were an English 17th century political movement active during English Civil War. It may also refer to

Levellers (band), a British rock band
Levellers (album), their eponymous third album

See also
Diggers, also called True Levellers, an anarchist or communist land rights movement (1649–1651)
The Leveller, a British radical political magazine published in the 1970s
Leveller, a variety of gooseberry
Levellers Day, an annual event commemorating the Banbury mutiny
Audio leveler, a process in sound production
Leveler (album), an album by the American band August Burns Red
Levelling (disambiguation)
Level (disambiguation)